Mirabad, Iran may refer to:

Mirabad, Tiran and Karvan, a village in Isfahan Province
Mirabad, Dorud, a village in Lorestan Province
Mirabad, Khorramabad, a village in Lorestan Province
Mirabad, Selseleh, a village in Lorestan Province